Suhas Shirvalkar (Devnagari:सुहास शिरवळकर- सुशि ) (15 November 1948 – 11 July 2003) was a Marathi writer from Maharashtra, India. Shirvalkar wrote Social Novels, Detective Stories, Short Stories, One Act Play, Newspaper Columns, Poems etc.

He authored more than 300 books including his well-known book "Duniyadari". Known for his detective-thrillers, he has also authored "Roopmati", a novel with a historical background, besides short stories, one-act plays. "Devaki", a Marathi movie based on one of his short-stories, won a State award for best story.

Duniyadari, a novel tracing the world of college-goers, was regarded a milestone in his writings.

The creator of characters like "Barrister Amar Vishwas [बॅ. अमर विश्वास], Firoz Irani [फिरोज ईराणी], Mandar Patwardhan [मंदार पटवर्धन] and Dara Buland [दारा बुलंद]" in his popular detective thrillers, he also managed to handle topics like medicine and astrology in great detail in his writings. His newspaper columns including "Ityadi-Ityadi, Vartulatim Mansa and Phalashruti" were well received by readers.

He died of cardiac arrest in Mumbai.

सनसनसनाटी

References

External links
http://suhasshirvalkar.blogspot.in/.
https://www.facebook.com/Suhas-Shirvalkar-194406710654163/

1948 births
2003 deaths
Indian crime fiction writers
Marathi-language writers
Novelists from Maharashtra